AREIT may be referred to:

 Australian real estate investment trust (A-REIT)
 AREIT, Inc. A Philippine REIT company